Good Vibes is an album by vibraphonist Gary Burton recorded 1969–70 and released on the Atlantic label in 1970.

Reception 
The Allmusic review by Ken Dryden described the album as being "rather dated and less satisfying than the vast majority of his other recordings from the era".

Track listing 
All compositions by Gary Burton except where noted.
 "Vibrafinger" – 6:37
 "Las Vegas Tango" (Gil Evans) – 6:30
 "Boston Marathon" – 7:19
 "Pain in My Heart" (Naomi Neville) – 4:46
 "Leroy the Magician" – 6:10
 "I Never Loved a Man (The Way I Love You)" (Ronnie Shannon) – 5:11
Recorded at Atlantic Recording Studios in New York on September 2–4, 1969.

Personnel 
 Gary Burton — vibraphone, piano, organ
 Eric Gale, Jerry Hahn, Sam Brown — guitar
 Richard Tee — piano, organ
 Steve Swallow — bass, electric bass
 Chuck Rainey — electric bass
 Bernard Purdie, Bill Lavorgna — drums, percussion

References 

Atlantic Records albums
Gary Burton albums
1969 albums
Albums produced by Joel Dorn